Intermittent positive pressure breathing (IPPB) is a respiratory therapy treatment for people who are hypoventilating.  While not a preferred method due to cost, IPPB is used to expand the lungs, deliver aerosol medications, and in some circumstances ventilate the patient.


Indications 
IPPB may be indicated for patients who are at risk for developing atelectasis and who are unable or unwilling to breathe deeply without assistance. In patients with severe lung hyperinflation, IPPB may decrease dyspnea and discomfort during nebulized therapy.

Contraindications 
Most contraindications are relative, such as nausea, hemodynamic instability, tracheal fistula, singulation and hemoptysis. Untreated tension pneumothorax is an absolute contraindication.

IMPLEMENTATION

When treating atelectasis -
 Therapy should be volume-oriented
2. Tidal volumes(VT) must be measured

3. VT goals must be set

4. VT goal of 10-15mL/kg ofbody weight

5. Pressure can be increased to reach VT goal if tolerated by patient.

When treating atelectasis, IPPB is only useful in the treatment of atelectasis if the volume delivered exceeds those volumes achieved by the patient's spontaneous efforts.

References 

Respiratory therapy